Parliamentary elections were held in Norway on 13 and 14 September 1981. The Labour Party remained the largest party in the Storting, winning 66 of the 155 seats. The Conservative Party made the strongest gains and formed a government on its own. In 1983 a majority coalition government with the Christian People's Party and the Centre Party was established.

Results

Seat distribution

Notes

References

1981
1981
Norway
1981 in Norway
September 1981 events in Europe